Creating Patterns is a studio album by 4hero, released via Talkin' Loud in 2001. It peaked at number 65 on the UK Albums Chart.

Track listing

"Blank Cells" and "The Day of the Greys" are included only on some editions.

Charts

References

External links 
 

2001 albums
4hero albums
Talkin' Loud albums
Nu jazz albums